The Rio Ouro Preto Biological Reserve is a biological reserve in the state of Rondônia, Brazil.

Location

The Rio Ouro Preto Biological Reserve is in the municipality of Guajará-Mirim, Rondônia.
The reserve has no inhabitants.
It is east of the town of Guajará-Mirim on the Bolivian border.
The Ouro Preto River, after which it is named, runs through the Rio Ouro Preto Extractive Reserve to the north.
The Rio Ouro Preto Biological Reserve runs along a line of low hills that separate the Rio Ouro Preto Extractive Reserve from the Rio Pacaás Novos Extractive Reserve to the south. 

The reserve is in the Pacaás Novos River basin.
Soils include quartz sand, red-yellow podzols and rocky outcrops.
The vegetation of the reserve is almost intact. 
It includes open submontane rainforest (54.82%), dense montane Savana of the Pacaás Novos (16.58%), rainforest-savanna transition (14.52%) and arboreal savanna (5.21%).

History

The act included a caveat that the armed forces and federal police had freedom of transit and access to undertake their duties of national security and public law enforcement, including installation of infrastructure such as access roads.
The word "State" was added to the unit's title, as "Rio Ouro Preto State Biological Reserve".

Notes

Sources

Biological reserves of Brazil
Protected areas of Rondônia
1990 establishments in Brazil
Protected areas established in 1990